Four regiments of the British Army have been numbered the 74th Regiment of Foot:

74th Regiment of Foot, renumbered from the 2nd Battalion, 38th Regiment of Foot in 1758 and disbanded in 1763
74th Regiment of Foot (Invalids), renumbered from the 117th in 1762 and disbanded in 1768
74th Regiment of (Highland) Foot (Argylshire Highlanders), raised in 1777 and disbanded in 1784
74th (Highland) Regiment of Foot (Campbell's Highlanders), raised in 1787 and amalgamated into the Highland Light Infantry in 1881